King Kobra is the fourth studio album by American hard rock band King Kobra. It was released on April 4, 2011 in Japan with 13 tracks and on April 15, 2011 in Europe and May 5, 2011 in North America with only 12 tracks. It is the first album to feature vocalist Paul Shortino and the first since 1986 to feature Johnny Rod, Mick Sweda, and Dave Henzerling (formerly David Michael-Philips) on bass and guitar, respectively.

Track listing
 "Rock This House" - 4:33
 "Turn Up the Good (Times)" - 4:41
 "Live Forever" - 4:21
 "Tear Down the Walls" - 3:55
 "This Is How We Roll - 3:42
 "Midnight Woman" - 4:15
 "We Got a Fever" - 4:03
 "Top of the World" - 4:10
 "You Make It Easy" - 4:40
 "Cryin' Turns to Rain" - 4:19
 "Screamin' for More" - 4:38
 "Fade Away" - 4:46
 "Red Flags" (Japan Only)

Lineup
 Paul Shortino - Lead and background vocals, guitar
 Dave Henzerling - Lead and rhythm guitars, keyboards, background vocals
 Johnny Rod - Bass
 Mick Sweda - Lead and rhythm guitars
 Carmine Appice - Drums and Percussion, background vocals

References 

King Kobra albums
2011 albums
Frontiers Records albums